The Dilling are an ethnic group of the Nuba peoples. The Dilling number several thousand and live mainly in the Nuba Mountains of South Kordofan state, in southern Sudan.

Language
The Dilling language is one of the Nubian languages of the Nilo-Saharan family. The Dilling language has become partially arabized.

See also
Index: Nuba peoples

External links 
The Nuba Mountains Homepage

Nuba peoples
Ethnic groups in Sudan